Mobile National Cemetery is a United States National Cemetery located in the city of Mobile, Alabama. It encompasses , and as of the end of 2005, had 5,326 interments. It is an annex to the larger Magnolia Cemetery.  Mobile National Cemetery is administered by Barrancas National Cemetery in Pensacola, Florida, and is currently closed to new interments.

History 
Mobile National Cemetery was established in 1865, when Union troops occupied the city of Mobile after the Battle of Mobile Bay, during the Civil War. By 1871, the cemetery had 841 interments, mostly soldiers whose remains were moved from other nearby battlefield sites.

Mobile National Cemetery was listed, along with the rest of Magnolia Cemetery, on the National Register of Historic Places on 13 June 1986.

Notable monuments 
 The 76th Illinois Volunteer Infantry Regiment Monument was erected in 1892 by the survivors of the Battle of Fort Blakely.
 The Confederate Fortification Monument, a granite monument, was erected by the United Daughters of the Confederacy in 1940.

Notable interments 
 Private First Class John Dury New (1924–1944), US Marine Corps Medal of Honor recipient for action in World War II in the Palau Islands.

See also 
 United States Department of Veterans Affairs

References

External links 
 National Cemetery Administration
 Mobile National Cemetery
 
 
 

National Register of Historic Places in Mobile, Alabama
Cemeteries on the National Register of Historic Places in Alabama
Historic American Landscapes Survey in Alabama
United States national cemeteries
1865 establishments in Alabama
Cemeteries in Mobile, Alabama
Cemeteries established in the 1860s